Mia Bonta ( Mialisa Tania Villafañe; born January 26, 1972) is an American politician serving as a member of the California State Assembly. A member of the Democratic Party, she represents the 18th Assembly District, which consists of Oakland, Alameda, and Emeryville.

Early life and education 
Bonta is the daughter of a divorced working mother in the Bronx. She attended Yale University, where she met Rob Bonta as a freshman. Bonta earned a Master of Education degree from the Harvard Graduate School of Education before attending Yale Law School with Rob Bonta.

Career 
Mia Bonta is the CEO of Oakland Promise, a nonprofit cradle-to-college support program focused on the city’s low-income students. In 2018, she was elected to the Alameda School Board.

During her special election campaigns, Bonta's opponents claimed that she benefited from her husband’s position and name, and pointed to money she has received from gambling interests that may be intended to influence Rob Bonta.  In the primary, Bonta finished first place with 38% of the vote, and in the runoff, she defeated human rights attorney Janani Ramachandran by 56% to 44%.

Personal life 
She has three children with her husband, Rob Bonta. Their daughter, Reina, is a filmmaker and plays soccer for the Yale Bulldogs and the Philippines national team.

Elections

References

External links
Join California Mia Bonta

1972 births
21st-century American women
American women chief executives
Harvard Graduate School of Education alumni
Hispanic and Latino American state legislators in California
Hispanic and Latino American women in politics
Living people
Democratic Party members of the California State Assembly
Nonprofit chief executives
Yale Law School alumni
American politicians of Puerto Rican descent
People of Afro–Puerto Rican descent
African-American state legislators in California
African-American women in politics